Debden Windmill  is a grade II listed Tower mill at Debden, Essex, England which has been converted to residential use.

History
Debden Windmill was built in 1796, replacing a Post mill which stood nearby. It was insured in 1797 by William Thurgood for £500 including the going gears and stock in trade. The fantail was blown off the mill on 26 March 1882 and the cap and sails were blown off on a Sunday in October 1887. Repairs were completed by 15 March 1888. The mill was working until 1911, in which year the sails and windshaft were removed. The mill was used as a scout hut in the 1930s and was little more than a shell in the 1950s. In 1957, a new cap was fitted and the mill converted to residential use.

Description

Debden Windmill is a four storey tower mill. When working it carried a conical cap with a gallery, winded by a fantail. The windshaft was cast iron and carried four double Patent sails which rotated clockwise. The Brake wheel was wood, driving a cast iron Wallower carried on a wooden Upright Shaft. The wooden Great Spur Wheel drove three pairs of millstones.

Millers
William Thurgood 1797
Isaac Thurgood 1832
John Holland Jr 1844
John Dennison 1855
Frank Holland 1870–1874
Alfred Ely 1878–1890
Charles (Clap) Ennos & Sons 1894 - 1910

References for above:-

References

External links
Windmill World webpage on Debden Mill

Tower mills in the United Kingdom
Grinding mills in the United Kingdom
Industrial buildings completed in 1796
Grade II listed buildings in Essex
Uttlesford
Grade II listed windmills
1796 establishments in England